Tschulaktavia is a genus of flowering plants belonging to the family Apiaceae.

Its native range is Central Asia.

Species:
 Tschulaktavia saxatilis (Bajtenov) Bajtenov ex Pimenov & Kljuykov

References

Apiaceae
Apiaceae genera